Matthew S. Sigman is an American chemist, focusing in Organic Synthesis & Asymmetric Catalysis. He is currently the Peter J. Christine S. Stang Presidential Endowed Chair  and Distinguished Honors Professor at University of Utah and a Fellow of the American Association for the Advancement of Science.

References

Year of birth missing (living people)
Living people
University of Utah faculty
21st-century American chemists
Organic chemists
Sonoma State University alumni
Washington State University alumni
Fellows of the American Association for the Advancement of Science